William Clingan (c.1721 – May 9, 1790) was a Founding Father of the United States, lawyer, and jurist. As a delegate in the Continental Congress for Pennsylvania from 1777 to 1779, he signed the Articles of Confederation. Upon his death he was buried in the Upper Octorara Church Cemetery in Parkesburg, Pennsylvania.

William Clingan and his brother immigrated to the Colonies from Scotland. His last name, Clingan, came from the Scottish surname of MacClingan. Much regarding his life is unknown.

References
 

Signers of the Articles of Confederation
1721 births
1790 deaths
Continental Congressmen from Pennsylvania
18th-century American politicians
Founding Fathers of the United States